The women's 20 kilometre walk at the 2012 African Championships in Athletics was held at the Stade Charles de Gaulle on  29 June.

Medalists

Records

Schedule

Results

Final

References

Results

Walk 20 Women
Racewalking at the African Championships in Athletics
2012 in women's athletics